The 2014–15 New Zealand Women's Twenty20 Competition was the eighth season of the women's Twenty20 cricket competition played in New Zealand. It ran from November 2014 to January 2015, with 6 provincial teams taking part. Wellington Blaze beat Otago Sparks in the final to win the tournament, their third Twenty20 title.

The tournament ran alongside the 2014–15 New Zealand Women's One-Day Competition.

Competition format 
Teams played in a round-robin in a group of six,  playing 5 matches overall. Matches were played using a Twenty20 format. The top two in the group advanced to the final.

The group worked on a points system with positions being based on the total points. Points were awarded as follows:

Win: 4 points 
Tie: 2 points 
Loss: 0 points.
Abandoned/No Result: 2 points.

Points table

Source: ESPN Cricinfo

 Advanced to the Final

Final

Statistics

Most runs

Source: ESPN Cricinfo

Most wickets

Source: ESPN Cricinfo

References

External links
 Series home at ESPN Cricinfo

Super Smash (cricket)
2014–15 New Zealand cricket season
New Zealand Women's Twenty20 Competition